Lucas Calabrese (born 12 December 1986 in Olivos) is an Argentine sailor. He competed in the 470 class (with Juan de la Fuente) at the 2012 Summer Olympics and won the bronze medal. He had earlier won gold and silver at the 2001 and 2000 Optimist World Championships.

References

External links
 
 
 

1986 births
Living people
Argentine male sailors (sport)
Olympic sailors of Argentina
Olympic bronze medalists for Argentina
Olympic medalists in sailing
Sailors at the 2012 Summer Olympics – 470
Sailors at the 2016 Summer Olympics – 470
Medalists at the 2012 Summer Olympics
Optimist class sailors
Optimist class world champions
World champions in sailing for Argentina
Argentine people of Italian descent
People from Vicente López Partido
Sportspeople from Buenos Aires Province